Sphegina flavimana (Malloch 1922), the Tuberculate Pufftail, is a fairly common species of syrphid fly observed in the northeastern United states and Canada. Hoverflies can remain nearly motionless in flight. The adults are also known as flower flies for they are commonly found on flowers, from which they get both energy-giving nectar and protein-rich pollen. Larvae are found in accumulations of decaying sap under bark, usually in wet situations such as damp, shaded woodland and in partially submerged wood in streams and pools.

Distribution
Canada, United States

References

Eristalinae
Insects described in 1922
Diptera of North America
Taxa named by John Russell Malloch